Belarusian Second League is the third tier of professional football in Belarus. It was established in 1992.

History and format
A strict number of teams and competition format are not defined for the league. Before the start of each season the format of the league is adjusted depending on how many teams are willing to participate and able to fulfill licensing criteria. A number of best teams (typically two, but not always) are getting promoted to Belarusian First League. 

 During 1992–1994, 2001–2002, 2004–2013 and since 2016 the League format was a simple double round-robin tournament (except for shortened 1992 season, which was a single round-robin tournament). The number of participating clubs varied between 13 and 20. 

 2003 season marked the lowest number of participants in League's history (12).

 During 1994–1999 the participants were split into two groups on a geographical basis. The number of participating clubs varied between 24 and 40. 

 In 2000 and during 2014–2015 the participants were split into two groups on a geographical basis.  The number of participating clubs varied between 20 and 24.

Second League in 2019

Format 
16 clubs will play twice (home and away) with each opponent for the total of 30 games. Two best teams will be promoted to Belarusian First League for 2019.

Winners and promoted teams

1 Not promoted; ineligible as a farm club.
2 Initially promoted, but dissolved before the start of the next season.

External links
Official website

 
3
Third level football leagues in Europe
Sports leagues established in 1992
1992 establishments in Belarus
Professional sports leagues in Belarus